The Victor Cushwa Memorial Bridge is a walking beam pedestrian bridge near Hancock, Maryland. It crosses Interstate 68 at the Sideling Hill road cut and rest area, near the northernmost point of I-68. It is named after former Maryland State Senator Victor Cushwa from Washington County.

Pedestrian bridges in Maryland
Beam bridges in the United States
Transportation buildings and structures in Washington County, Maryland